Locator may refer to:

 One who locates, or is entitled to locate, a land or mining claim
 Lokator (in Latin locator), a medieval servant in charge of organizing colonization and settlement 
 Locator map
 Locator software, a type of e-commerce software
 Maidenhead Locator System, a method used by amateur radio operators to define locations on the Earth
 Record locators used by airlines and travel agencies
 Uniform Resource Locator (URL)
 A device used in acoustic location
 The Locator, a series of novels by Richard Greener which were adapted into the television series The Finder
(Laboratory) A person in charge of knowing where all the staff of a laboratory are located, using signals from a badge that the staff wear.

Aviation
 Non-directional beacon, a radio navigation aid for use by pilots of aircraft 
 Locator outer marker, a radio navigation aid for use with an aircraft instrument landing system

See also
 Locate (disambiguation)
 Location (disambiguation)